Jacobus Johannes "Jim" Fouché,  (6 June 1898 – 23 September 1980), also known as J. J. Fouché, was a South African politician who served as the second state president of South Africa from 1968 to 1975.

Early life 
He was born in the Boer republic of the Orange Free State in 1898 (which became a British colony in 1902 and a province of the Union of South Africa in 1910) and matriculated at Paarl Boys' High School.

Career 
Fouché was a successful farmer. A staunch republican, he was a member of the National Party for many years, first being elected to the House of Assembly as MP for Smithfield from 1941 to 1950, and as MP for Bloemfontein West between 1960 and 1968.

Fouché served as Administrator of the Orange Free State from 1950 to 1959, and was then promoted to the Cabinet, where he served as Minister of Defence from 14 December 1959 to 1 April 1966 and as Minister of Agricultural Technical Services and Water Affairs from 1966 to 1968. He was elected State President in place of Ebenhaezer Dönges (who had been elected, but died before he could take office), and served as ceremonial head of state from 1968 to 1975. He was the only State President to complete a full term in office.

Family 
Fouché married Letta Rhoda ('Lettie') McDonald, a fellow white woman of Anglo-African descent and Scots extraction.

Depiction on coins 
He is depicted on the following coins of the South African rand;

1976 1/2 Cent to 50 Cents.

References

External links

1898 births
1980 deaths
People from Mangaung Metropolitan Municipality
Orange Free State people
Afrikaner people
Herenigde Nasionale Party politicians
National Party (South Africa) politicians
State Presidents of South Africa
Defence ministers of South Africa
Members of the House of Assembly (South Africa)